E Jingwen (born February 15, 1989), also known as Vin E or E Bo, is a Chinese actress. E is considered a "Sing girl"—an actress who first received media attention through starring in the movie which directed by Stephen Chow, after she has known for her role as "Ru Meng" in The New King of Comedy (2019).

Early life
E graduated from the Central Academy of Drama. E has participated in Hubei Satellite TV 's comedy show, such as comedy madness , Oriental TV 's Swordsman , Laughter Legend, and so on, and have achieved good results. In 2019, she received media attention through starring in the movie which directed by Stephen Chow - The New King of Comedy. On October 11th, 2019, she joined China's first director's selection of the reality show "The actor please be in place ."

Filmography

Film

TV shows

Awards and nominations

References

External links

1989 births
Living people
21st-century Chinese actresses
Chinese film actresses
Central Academy of Drama alumni
Actresses from Harbin